JPM is a Taiwanese Mandopop music band formed under the management of Sony Music company with artists Jay Chou, Leehom Wang, and Vanness Wu. The group debuted on January 11, 2011 with three members: Liljay, Prince, and Mao Di from A Legend Star Entertainment Corp. Two members (Jay and Prince) were originally part of Lollipop until 2009, while Mao Di is from Choc7.

Prior to Mao Di's addition, Jay and Prince released a single entitled Dance Can Be Replaced ("舞可取代") on July 8, 2010. On August 26, 2011, JPM finally released their debut album, Moonwalk which contains ten songs and one Cantonese version of "Because of You".

Etymology
The name of the band is taken from the first letters of each member's names: LilJay, Prince and Modi, forming the band name, JPM.

History

2010: Pre-JPM
Former Lollipop members, Qiu Wang Zi and Liao had been undergoing a series of secret training for the past year after they had separated with the band in 2009. On July 8, 2010, the two of them released a single entitled Dance Can Be Replaced ("舞可取代"). On September 10, they had their first concert at the Hong Kong Kowloon Bay International Trade and Exhibition Center to promote their single. In the end, their first single was successful as they received six awards at the end of the year, which includes "Popular Dance Song Award" and "Idol Award" by the "Metro Radio Mandarin Hits Music Awards Presentation", "Best Dance Song Award" and "Idol Award" by the "Seventh Hit Golden King Awards", and "Outstanding Dance Song Singers" and "Network Popular Singers" by the "Chinese Golden Melody Awards".

2011: Moon Walk Debut
On the day of A Legend Star Entertainment Corp.'''s first anniversary, Liao and Qiu decided to get back together and form a new group called JPM, alongside Qiu's brother, Mao Di, on January 11, 2011. JPM aims for the top idol group in Asia with the release of their highly anticipated debut album. On August 26, 2011, JPM finally released their first album entitled Moonwalk. Their single, Moon Walk features a million-dollar music video in which the boys perform a spectacular "space dance" tailor-made for them by famous Taiwan dance choreographer Terry Lin. Aside from the music video, JPM members also contributed with the making of their album as Liao filled the role of the producer for part of the album, while Qiu Wang Zi is the lyricist of three songs and composer of two songs in the album. In addition with the ten songs listed, the album also includes a Cantonese version of "因為有你" (Because of You). On August 29, three days after its release, the album sales reached more than 50,000 copies. At the end of the year, JPM garnered two awards from the "8th Hit King Golden Awards","勁歌王明星採訪——JPM".CNTV.Retrieved 2013-06-10. and three more in other music awards.

During this year, JPM members are also active in other fields. Liao continued his hosting career.蘋果娛樂一週. 壹電視. Taiwan, 1 Sept. 2011. Television. Qiu Wang Zi was cast in two films,極速先鋒. Perf. Wang Zi, Lín Shuǎng, and Sānpǔ Guìdà. 2011. and starred in the television series "33 Gu Shi Guan (Fake Chocolate episode)" with Nikki Deng.

2012-present: 365 Album and first concert
On January 25, JPM released a Japanese version for Moonwalk album. The album consists of Normal Edition and First Press Limited Edition, which comes with a bonus DVD containing five music videos, one-hour music special, and interview footage.

During the first half of the year, JPM received two awards: "Hito Potential Group" and "Best Newcomer Award" from the 2012 Hito Pop Music Awards and Sprite Billboard Awards respectively, for their Moonwalk debut last year.

On November 30, JPM released their second studio album entitled 365 under the same label, Sony Music Taiwan. They use "Love" as the main theme of this album. In other words, each song is used to describe different types and stages of love. In addition with the theme of love, 365 album also emphasized the "Golden Triangle" concept to capture each members' individual firm and confidence and also to represent their strong brotherhood. According to Sony Music, JPM said: "We are the Golden triangle, the best ally and best friend" (「我們是黃金鐵三角，是最好的戰友也是最好的朋友」). Demonstrating the trio's mastery of a multitude of music styles, the new album's track list includes an electro-dance K-Pop-styled titular song "365 Days" especially produced by Korean producers. Moreover, the track list also includes a solo song for each member, and a collaboration with Kimberley Chen entitled "Internet". Once again, Liao and Qiu Wang Zi took part in putting the album together as Liao filled the role of the producer for half of the album, lyricist of three songs and the composer of two songs, while Qiu is the lyricist of the main song, 365, of the album.

Within the first week of its release, 365 managed to reach top three on the charts. JPM continued to promote their album all over and outside of their area, sometimes including Kimberley Chen with them. They are also invited to be "Red Heart charity spokespersons" not only to publicize their new album, but to do public service to families in need as well, as reported on December 13, 2012.

At the end of the year, JPM received two awards: "Metro Music Best Dance Song" and "Metro Music Awards in Asia jumped to sing Group" from the Metro Music Awards 2012 for their 365 album. To add to their awards list, JPM received eight music awards in the first half of 2013."JPM狂攬6項大獎再度稱王 春季時尚寫真大曝光" .ChinaYes.Retrieved 2013-06-10.

In June, it was announced that JPM would have their first concert, "JPM LovEvolution concert tour 2013 Love Evolution Tour" on August 3 at the Taipei ATT SHOW BOX."JPM熬6年圓夢 8月演唱會".News Entertainment.Retrieved 2013-06-25. Because of the extensive preparation, the group even declined seven movie/drama proposals."JPM棄上百萬片酬開個唱　操肌特訓望甩沒實力臭名".Yahoo.Retrieved 2013-06-25.

Members

Discography

Filmography

Films

Short films

Television series

Stage Dramas

Books
 2011年2月 傳奇星2011寫真記事 - Legendary Star 2011 Photo Calendar

AwardsFor individual awards list, see also: Liao Xiao Jie's Awards, Qiu Wang Zi's Awards and Qiu Mao Di's Awards''

See also
 Lollipop (group)
 Choc7

References

External links
  JPM at Sony Music

Musical groups established in 2011
Taiwanese boy bands
Mandopop musical groups
Sony Music Taiwan albums
2011 establishments in Taiwan